Legal forms of gambling in the U.S. state of Massachusetts include casinos, parimutuel wagering on horse racing, the Massachusetts Lottery, and charitable gaming. The Massachusetts Gaming Commission regulates commercial operations under state jurisdiction.

Horse and dog racing
Parimutuel wagering on horse racing is allowed at the state's only active racetrack, Plainridge Racecourse. Simulcast wagering on horse and dog races is also offered at Suffolk Downs and Raynham Park, which previously operated as racetracks.

Betting on horse and dog racing was legalized in 1934. 

Suffolk Downs opened in 1935 and was the state's primary site for Thoroughbred racing until it held its last races in 2019.

The first dog tracks were Wonderland Greyhound Park and Taunton Dog Track, opened in 1935. They were joined in 1941 by Raynham Greyhound Park. The Taunton track closed in 1981, and its operations were absorbed into the Raynham track, which became known as Raynham-Taunton Greyhound Park. Both remaining tracks closed by the end of 2009, when dog racing was banned by the Massachusetts Greyhound Protection Act.

Harness racing began in 1947 at Bay State Raceway (later named Foxboro Raceway). Suffolk Downs included the sport in its calendar from 1959 to 1970. Foxboro closed in 1997 and was replaced in 1999 with the opening of Plainridge.

In addition to the major tracks, wagering was also conducted on horse and dog races at agricultural fairs around the state, including the Northampton Fair, Marshfield Fair, Great Barrington Fair, Weymouth Fair, Berkshire County Fair (at Berkshire Downs), Brockton Fair, and Topsfield Fair. Race fixing was notoriously common at these meets. This fair circuit came to an end when the last remaining venue, Northampton, held its final racing meet in 2005.

Lottery

The Massachusetts Lottery offers draw games and scratchcards. The Lottery also offers pull tabs for sale at bars.

Private lotteries were common in early colonial history, but as public attitudes turned against them, Massachusetts banned all lotteries in 1719. The province's first public lottery was authorized in 1745, to pay for expenses related to King George's War. At least fifteen lotteries were authorized from 1749 to 1761, until the Lords of Trade expressed their disapproval of the practice, effectively banning public lotteries in Massachusetts until the American Revolution, when lotteries again became frequent, until a new ban was enacted in 1833. The modern Lottery was created in 1971 and held its first drawings the following year.

Charitable gaming
Eligible non-profit organizations are allowed to operate certain gambling games for fundraising purposes, including bridge and whist, bingo (also called "beano"), raffles, pull tabs, and casino nights (referred to as "bazaars"). Senior citizen organizations ("golden age clubs") are also allowed to run bingo games with little oversight, with prizes of $100 or less. 

As of 2017, the total annual gross revenues reported for charitable gaming were about $57 million, with $25 million from bingo, $12 million from pull tabs, $19 million from raffles, and $300,000 from bazaars. There were 116 licensed charitable bingo operators.

Several poker rooms throughout the state operate under the casino night law, with daily games benefitting a rotating set of charities.

Whist and bridge fundraisers were legalized in 1932. Beano was legalized in 1934, but then banned in 1943 because racketeers were operating games using charities as fronts. Raffles and bazaars were authorized in 1969. Beano was re-legalized in 1971, with a local election required in each city or town to allow it.

Sports Betting 
Sports Betting is the activity of wagering money on a certain outcome of a "sports" game. This can range from betting on a team winning to a certain player scoring a specific amount of points. The payout depends on how likely the outcome is to happen. This activity had been banned until 2018 due to a federal legislation known as the Professional and Amateur Sports Protection Act of 1992. The Supreme Court had agreed with the Professional league which "held firm that gambling was bad for their games, building their arguments around integrity". This ruling came from events such as the Black Sox scandal in which several players from the professional baseball team, "Chicago White Sox", were accused of intentionally throwing the game for monetary gain through a third-party betting against them. This scandal had a great impact on the integrity of the game and led to the creation of the "Commissioner of Baseball". Of course, the federal ruling affected Massachusetts alongside the rest of the United States.

However, this was then overturned in 2018 due to the fact that the Supreme Court agreed with "New Jersey’s argument that PASPA violated the anti-commandeering principle". This opened the door for many states to begin talks about Sports Betting. Hotel casinos such as Encore and MGM were ready to implement this newly-legal service as it would align with their existing business model. And so, Charlie Baker signed new legislations regarding Sports Betting in Massachusetts. After back and forth talks, the Sports Betting Conference Committee reached a decision to legalize most aspects of sports betting such as betting on Professional and Collegiate-level teams.  The bill also included a tax for any form of bets (20% online and 15% in person).

While the bill has come into effect, companies still need to register to become a venue for sports betting by applying for a license. As of January 31st, only retail casinos are allowed to offer sports betting, and three locations are now open for in-person wagers. Online and mobile sports betting in Massachusetts will launch on March 10, 2023 at 10 a.m. Eastern Time.  The Massachusetts Gaming Commission is currently in the process of delivering more licenses. As stated by the MGC, "Applications for Category 2 licenses will be accepted on a rolling basis. A non-refundable application fee of $200,000 must accompany any application". Thus, there are plans for the launch of sports betting online services for Massachusetts by a variety of companies this year. It has been announced that seven different sportsbook operators will launch a sports betting app on March 10, and three others will launch in the coming months. After that, up to five more licenses could be awarded by the MGC.

Casinos

List of casinos
</onlyinclude>
</onlyinclude>
</onlyinclude>
</onlyinclude>
</onlyinclude>
</onlyinclude>

Indian casinos
Both of the state's federally recognized tribes have worked for several years to open gaming facilities on tribal lands, under the federal Indian Gaming Regulatory Act. The Mashpee Wampanoag Tribe hopes to open a casino on land in Taunton. The Wampanoag Tribe of Gay Head (Aquinnah) plans a small gaming facility in Aquinnah, on Martha's Vineyard.

The Mashpee tribe gained federal recognition in 2007, and in 2015 received approval for land to be taken into trust for a casino. Construction on the casino, referred to as Project First Light, began in 2016, located in an industrial park. Later that year, however, a court overturned the land-into-trust approval, and work on the project was suspended. The casino remained in legal limbo as of 2019.

The Aquinnah tribe announced plans in 2013 for their Class II gaming facility in an unfinished community center. The state quickly sued to block the project, arguing that the tribe gave up gambling rights in a 1983 land settlement, in which the tribe agreed its lands would be subject to state law. The tribe argued that this agreement was superseded by the 1988 Indian Gaming Regulatory Act. The tribe prevailed in the legal fight in 2018, and began moving ahead with plans to build the casino at a new site on their reservation.

Commercial casinos
Under the Expanded Gaming Act, passed in 2011, as many as three casino resorts and one slot parlor can be opened. A slot parlor opened at Plainridge Park Casino in 2015, and two casino resorts, MGM Springfield and Encore Boston Harbor, opened in 2018 and 2019, respectively. One more casino license may be issued for the southeastern part of the state, but the process has been delayed due to uncertainty about potential competition from the planned Mashpee Wampanoag casino.

Casino cruises
Gambling boats have operated at times out of Massachusetts harbors, taking passengers on "cruises to nowhere" in federal waters, where state gambling laws do not apply. The first was the Vegas Express, which sailed out of Gloucester from 1998 to 1999. The Southern Elegance and the El Dorado set out from Gloucester starting in 1999, as did the Midnight Gambler out of Lynn, before it moved to Provincetown and operated for six weeks in 2000. Another boat, run by Atlantic Casino Cruises, ran out of Gloucester from 2002 to 2003. The Lynn harbor also played host to the Horizon's Edge casino cruise, from 2000 to 2009, and the Aquasino, which ran for several months in 2013.

See also

 2014 Massachusetts Casino Repeal Initiative proposition
 2016 Massachusetts Expand Slot Machine Gaming Initiative proposition
 List of casino hotels  
 Gambling in the United States
 List of casinos in the United States
 Massachusetts Council on Compulsive Gambling

References

External links
 
 Massachusetts Gaming Commission

 
Massachusetts
Massachusetts
Massachusetts law